Instruction on transliteration of Belarusian geographical names with letters of Latin script is an official standard of Romanization of Belarusian geographical names.

Status
The instruction was adopted by a decree of the Belarusian State Committee on Land Resources, Geodetics and Cartography (2000-11-23). The official name of the document is: . The document had been published in the National registry of the judicial acts of the Republic Belarus (issue №3, 2001-01-11).

It is reported in the press that since October 2006 this instruction is recommended for use by the Working Group on Romanization Systems of the United Nations Group of Experts on Geographical Names (UNGEGN). The final decision of the UN was planned for a 2007 conference.

The system was modified again on 11 June 2007, mainly in order to conform with the recommendations of the UN WGRS, which advise avoiding the use of digraphs if possible, and adopted by the UN in version 3.0 of their romanization report, 17 March 2008. The transliteration standard is based on the traditional Belarusian Latin alphabet (Łacinka).

In February 2013 the system was recommended for adoption as the international system for the romanization of Belarusian geographical names.

The instruction replaces the previous equivalent regulations and sets up the rules of the rendering of the Belarusian geographical names, which are mandatory on the territory of the Republic of Belarus, when producing the cartographic and other (equivalent?) goods, destined for the international use.

Romanization guidelines
Three diacritical signs are used:
 caron ( ˇ ), U+030C, combined only with Cc, Ss, Zz.
 acute accent ( ´ ), U+0301, combined only with Cc, Ll, Nn, Ss, Zz.
 breve ( ˘ ), U+0306, combined only with Uu.

Note:
The initial 2000 version differed from the above: ў = ú, ь = ’ (apostrophe; e.g., дзь = dz’, зь = z’, ль = l’, нь = n’, сь = s’, ць = c’).

See also
Romanization of Belarusian
Belarusian Latin alphabet

References

External links
 №8/4488 Об утверждении Инструкции по транслитерации географических названий Республики Беларусь буквами латинского алфавита // Национальный реестр правовых актов Республики Беларусь. №3, 11 января 2001.
 8/16668 О внесении изменений и дополнений в Инструкцию по транслитерации географических названий Республики Беларусь буквами латинского алфавита
 National System of Geographic Names Transmission into Roman Alphabet in Belarus. Ninth United Nations Conference on the Standardization of Geographical Names. New York, 21–30 August 2007. Document E/CONF.98/CRP.21.
 United Nations Statistics Division, Geographical Names
 Keyboard Lithuaniae 1009—2009 i Litwinska-biełaruskaja lacinskaja abeceda

Belarusian language
Belarusian